The Gavilanes de Matamoros Fútbol Club, commonly known as Gavilanes, is a Mexican football club based in Matamoros, Tamaulipas. The club was founded on 2011, and currently plays in the Serie A of Liga Premier.

History
The team was founded in August 2011, taking the place of the team Hogar de Matamoros. He played his first match in  Third Division on August 21, 2011 against Orinegros de Ciudad Madero, the final score was 1–0 in favor of Orinegros. On August 26, the club is officially presented by Horacio García, with Jorge Alberto Hinojosa being the team's first technical director.

In August 2017, Gavilanes de Matamoros began to participate in the Serie A of the Liga Premier de México (Second Division), after acquiring an expansion franchise.

Players

Current squad
.

Reserve teams
Gavilanes de Matamoros (Liga TDP)
Reserve team that plays in the Liga TDP, the fourth level of the Mexican league system.

Managers 
  Jorge Alberto Hinojosa (2011–2015)
  Carlos Martínez (2015–2016)
  Jorge Alberto Hinojosa (2016–2017)
  Carlos Martínez (2017–2018)
  Mario Pérez (2018)
  Jorge Humberto Torres (2018)
  Jorge Alberto Urbina (2019)
  Lorenzo López Balboa (2019–2020)
  Jorge Martínez Merino (2020–2022)
  Lucas Ayala (2022)
  Julio García (2022–)

References

External links 

Association football clubs established in 2011
Football clubs in Tamaulipas
2011 establishments in Mexico
Liga Premier de México